Conrad Laforte (November 10, 1921 – September 4, 2008) was a Québécois ethnologist and librarian. He created the Catalogue de la Chanson Folklorique Francaise which contains 80,000 entries.

Early life and education
Laforte was born in Kénogami. He studied in Chicoutimi, the Université Laval, and finally the Université de Montréal.

Career

Laforte studied and wrote about the origins of traditional French and French Canadian music, and worked with anthropologist Marius Barbeau to record many songs and stories that had been until then passed down orally in the culture. Laforte's best-known work is the six volume Catalogue de la Chanson Folklorique Francaise.

Laforte taught folklore at the University of Laval. He also developed a set of criteria for classifying songs by genre. In 1982 he was elected to membership in the Royal Society of Canada. His honours include the Marius-Barbeau Medal and the Raymond-Casgrain Prize.

Works
 La chanson folklorique et les écrivains du XIXe siècle en France et au Québec, 1973.
 Le catalogue de la chanson folklorique francaise ; pref. de Luc Lacourciere  Presses de l'Universite Laval, Quebec :  1977.
 Menteries Droles iet Merveilleuses, 1978
 Survivances médiévales dans la chanson folklorique, 1981.
 Chansons strophiques, 1981.
 Chansons sur des timbres, 1983.
 Chansons folkloriques à sujet religieux, 1988.
 Poétiques de la chanson traditionnelle française, 1993.
^ Vision d'un Societé par les chansons de tradition orale à caractère épique et tragique, 1997 (with Monique Jutras)

References

Jean-Nicolas De Surmont (ed.), publiés avec la collaboration de Serge Gauthier, M'amie, faites moi un bouquet… », Mélanges posthumes autour de l'œuvre de Conrad Laforte, Québec, Presses de l'Université Laval, Editions Charlevoix, 2011

Canadian librarians
Canadian ethnologists
Université Laval alumni
Université de Montréal alumni
1921 births
Writers from Saguenay, Quebec
2008 deaths
Canadian non-fiction writers in French
Canadian male non-fiction writers

Academic staff of Université Laval